News One is a Pakistani Urdu-language TV channel, based in Karachi. It launched on 27 November 2007 and is owned by Air Waves Media (Pvt) Ltd, a subsidiary of the Interflow Group which also owns TV One, Waseb TV, Sonic TV and FM91. The channel is broadcast from the Paksat 1R satellite.

Current programming
 Rah-e-Hidayat
Shatranj (Mon-Thurs 10:05pm)
 Sports1 (Friday 11:03pm)
G For Gharida Farooqi (Mon-Thurs 8:03pm)
 Weekend With Hina
Wake Up Pakistan (Friday-Saturday 7:05pm)
Right Angle
Har Zaviye (Mon-Tues 7:05pm)

 Former programs 
Popular Shows

 Siyasi AkharaKya Yeh Sub Drama Hai    Muqadma Eid Apno Ke SaathEntertainment World Crosstalk America Chalo
 Brass Tracks Barkat-e-Ramzan Baniya Khawaja Naveed Ki Adalat
 End Of Time Eid Ke TohfayEid With HinaFront Page Capital CircuitAwaz-E-Pakistan Akhir Kyun
 D ChowkDes Pardes Aks KarwaiKhula Such Kya Hum Tiyar Hain Achanak
 Bails Off
 JaizaJahan-e-Taaza The Umar Sharif Show
The Right Angle
Prime Time with Rana Mubashir
 Weekend Rangeen
 Mera Sawaal
 Crime FileChicken Cabinet Akhir Kab TaakPrime Time With TMAdabi Sheer Khurma Gunah
 Economy Pakistan
 The One Man Show
 Ghaib Ki Dunya
 Hum Qadam Pakistan Chowk
 Pas e Parda Abb Kya Hoga
 Suragh
 Aitraaf
 News1 Eid Lounge
 MediaPa
Sach Ka Safar
 Ikhtalafi Note
 Ishq Ramzan
 Bisaat Choo Lo Asman
 CSI Islamabad CallingIkhlaq Bhai Ki Gaye Morning Masala
 Bang e Dara
 Karwan
 Ramzan Aur Awam
 Rang-e-Sukhan Siyasat Aur Pakistan
 End Of Time The Lost Chapters
 Choti ki Bari Eid
 Mehfil-E-Mushaira
 The Book Club
 Quran Kahaniyan
 Siyasi Noutangi
 Hirasat
 Fortune Pakistan
 Fankar GaliyanFashionista National InterestNewsOne SpecialTakraTonight With JasmeenThe Lucman
Ghumshuda GaenMazraat Ke SaathMaya KahaniGehri Nazar
Eid Hungama
Ishq Ramazan
Yeh JunoonKaun Banega CrorepatiLive With Nadia MirzaLive With Dr.Shahid MasoodSocial DiariesThe Umar Sharif Show Special Programming Barkat e Ramazan (2015)Ishq Ramazan Muharram News One Eid LoungeSponored ProgrammingVeet Miss Super Model (Mini Series)Miss Veet PakistanMiss Veet Pakistan 2Nescafe BasementSprite Spice WarsAlways Karo YaqeenEasypaisa RaahiBattle of the BandsCoke Studio (Pakistan)Non-Scripted/Reality ShowsEntertainment WorldFashionista''

See also 
 TV One
 FM91
 Sonic TV
 List of news channels in Pakistan

References

External links 

24-hour television news channels in Pakistan
Television channels and stations established in 2007
Television stations in Karachi
2007 establishments in Pakistan